"This Happy Madness" (aka "Estrada Branca", Portuguese for "white road") is a bossa nova song composed in 1958 by Antônio Carlos Jobim with lyrics by Vinícius de Moraes. English-language lyrics were added later by Gene Lees.

According to Jobim's sister, Helena, he composed "Estrada Branca" in their parents’ home in the village of Poço Fundo, and it was one of several songs inspired by the rain.

Gene Lees, who wrote the English lyrics, said, "The melody is one of Antonio Carlos Jobim’s early ones, and the song is, again, very difficult to sing." Music writer Doug Ramsey praised Lees' work on the song: "'This Happy Madness' is one of the finest sets of lyrics to grace a Jobim song in any language."

The first recording of the song was in April 1958 by Elizete Cardoso for her album Canção do Amor Demais, which bossa nova historian Ruy Castro says "inaugurated the bossa nova sound."

Recorded versions
 Elizete Cardoso - Canção do Amor Demais (1958)
 Lenita Bruno – Por Tôda Minha Vida (1959)
 Alaíde Costa - Gosto de Você (1959)
 Frank Sinatra - Sinatra & Company (rec. 1969, released in 1971)
 Dexter Gordon - More Than You Know (1975) - with vocal by Dexter Gordon
 Antônio Carlos Jobim - Terra Brasilis (1980)
 Carlos Barbosa-Lima - Carlos Barbosa-Lima Plays Jobim & Gershwin (1982)
 Joe Henderson - Double Rainbow: The Music of Antonio Carlos Jobim (1995)
 Edu Lobo - Meia Noite (1995)
 Kenny Rankin - Here in My Heart (1997)
 Carol Saboya & Nelson Faria - Interpretam Canções de Antônio Carlos Jobim (1999)
 Chico Buarque - Olha Que Coisa Mais Linda: Uma Homenagem a Tom Jobim (2001)
 Jaques Morelenbaum, Paula Morelenbaum, and Ryuichi Sakamoto - Casa (2001)
 Phil Woods & Barbara Casini, with Stefano Bollani - Você e Eu (2001)
 Karrin Allyson - Imagina: Songs of Brasil (2008)
 Diana Panton - To Brazil with Love (2011)
 Stacey Kent - The Changing Lights (2013)

References

Songs with music by Antônio Carlos Jobim
Songs with lyrics by Vinicius de Moraes
Frank Sinatra songs
Brazilian songs
1958 songs